KJZ or kjz may refer to:

 "KJZ", a 1997 song by Photek from their album Modus Operandi
 kjz, the ISO 639-3 code for Bumthang language, Bhutan